Nicholas Morgan is a former athlete who competed for England.

Athletics career
He represented England in the shot put at the 1958 British Empire and Commonwealth Games in Cardiff, Wales.

He was a member of the Surrey County Athletic Association.

References

English male shot putters
Athletes (track and field) at the 1958 British Empire and Commonwealth Games
Possibly living people
Year of birth missing
Commonwealth Games competitors for England